Epitamyra is a genus of snout moths. It was described by Émile Louis Ragonot in 1891.

Species
Epitamyra albomaculalis (Möschler, 1890)
Epitamyra birectalis Hampson, 1897
Epitamyra minusculalis (Möschler, 1890)

References

Chrysauginae
Pyralidae genera
Taxa named by Émile Louis Ragonot